Mumbai North West Lok Sabha constituency is a constituency represented in the Lok Sabha of the Parliament of India, having approximately 1.6 million voters.

Assembly segments
Presently, Mumbai North West constituency comprises six Vidhan Sabha (Legislative Assembly) segments. These segments are:

Members of Parliament

^ -bypoll

Election results

1998

1999

2004

Bye election 2005

2009

2014

2019

See also
 List of Constituencies of the Lok Sabha
 Mumbai

Notes

External links
 e-Vachanama of Gajanan Kirtikar
 Candidate Affidavits for 2009 General Election
 Shivsena-BJP-RPI(A)Mahayuti Candidate Gajanan Kirtikar Official Website
 Kamaal Rashid Khan withdraw nomination as SP candidate,
Mumbai North-West lok sabha  constituency election 2019 results details

Politics of Mumbai
Lok Sabha constituencies in Maharashtra
Lok Sabha constituencies in Mumbai